Anya Ulinich (born 1973) is a contemporary Russian American writer and visual artist. She is the author of Petropolis (Viking, 2007), and Lena Finkle’s Magic Barrel, a graphic novel (Penguin, 2014).

Petropolis, a Sami Rohr Prize Finalist, presents the American dream as no longer a matter of material success, or even educational opportunities, but of “finding a place for one's misfit heart”. Lena Finkle’s Magic Barrel has been described as "a late-life bildungsroman that somehow combines a great Russian heaviness of spirit with invigorating humour, moving effortlessly from Chekhov to OkCupid clichés." Ayelet Waldman's review in the New York Times describes hers as a "rare, indeed magical, talent.”

Awards
 National Book Foundation's "5 under 35" Winner (2007)

Selected works
 Petropolis (Viking, 2007)
 Lena Finkle's Magic Barrel (Penguin, 2014)

References

External links
 Anya Ulinich | Penguin Random House 
 Ayelet Waldman reviews Lena Finkle's Magic Barrel in The New York Times
 Lena Finkle's Magic Barrel in the Los Angeles Times
 Katie Roiphe on Lena Finkle's Magic Barrel
 Kevin Kinsella interviews Anya Ulinich about 'Petropolis'

1973 births
Living people
American graphic novelists
21st-century American novelists
American women novelists
21st-century American women writers
Russian emigrants to the United States